Mwangata is an administrative ward in the Iringa Urban district of the Iringa Region of Tanzania. In 2016 the Tanzania National Bureau of Statistics report there were 14,111 people in the ward, from 13,486 in 2012.

Neighborhoods 
The ward has 11 neighborhoods.

 Isoka 'A'
 Isoka 'B'
 Kigamboni
 Kisiwani
 Mawelewele
 Muungano
 Mwangata 'A'
 Mwangata 'B'
 Mwangata 'C'
 Mwangata 'D'
 Ngelewala

References 

Wards of Iringa Region